Piero Scaruffi (born 1955) is an Italian-American writer who maintains a website on which his reviews of music, film, and art are published. He has created his own publishing entity called Omnipublishing, that exclusively releases his books about music and science.

Biography

Early life and education 
Scaruffi was born in 1955 in Trivero, a comune in the Province of Biella of Italy. He graduated from the University of Turin with a degree in Mathematics.

Career 
For a number of years he worked for Olivetti on artificial intelligence. as well as at Stanford University. He has been a visiting scholar at Harvard University and Stanford University (conducting research on Artificial Intelligence and Cognitive Science), lectured on "The Nature of Mind" and "History of Knowledge" (most recently at U.C. Berkeley), and published on artificial intelligence and cognitive science, including Thinking About Thought (2003) and The Nature of Consciousness (2006).

His work aims to bridge artificial intelligence, mathematics, science and art. As a software consultant, he worked on Internet applications, Artificial Intelligence and Object-Oriented design in Silicon Valley. He is an Italian-American, a naturalized U.S. citizen. He also writes about music. He has self-published books on Omniware, a publishing company of which he is also the president and founder. Omniware has so far exclusively released books by Scaruffi. He published books about the history of rock music, jazz, avant garde music and modern popular music. One of them, A History of Rock Music, 1951–2000, self-published on iUniverse in 2003, spans 50 years of the genre; Scaruffi estimated that it had sold 1,500 copies by 2006. His writings on music are hosted online on his own website, scaruffi.com, and include a history of jazz and a history of modern classical music. The website, especially its music section, was the subject of an article in The New York Times by Dan Morrell on October 15, 2006. Morrell noted the "staggering" volume of Scaruffi's work, given that the site is "a one-man operation". From 2000 to 2003 he was a member of the Governing Board of Directors of the journal Leonardo. The most widely known entry on Scaruffi's website is his career-spanning essay on the Beatles, effectively a polemic against the critical and popular consensus regarding the band's influence on modern music.

Scaruffi chaired, among others, the Big Bang conference of June 2008 at UC-Berkeley. He has compiled an extensive "Annotated Bibliography of Mind-Related" Topics", as well. He has been running the Leonardo Art Science Evenings (LASERS) at the University of San Francisco and Stanford University, a series that he established in 2008 and as of 2022 spread to 50 universities worldwide. He also runs the interdisciplinary quarterly events SMMMASH at Stanford University. Scaruffi is involved in organising and moderating events for Stanford Continuing Studies.

Personal life 
Scaruffi resides in Redwood City in Silicon Valley, California, as he has since 1983.

Bibliography 
Books on music

 (Volume 1 of Arcana's Storia del Rock series)
 (Volume 2 of Arcana's Storia del Rock series)
 (Volume 3 of Arcana's Storia del Rock series)
 (Volume 4 of Arcana's Storia del Rock series)

  (Volume 5 of Arcana's Storia del Rock series)

  (Volume 6 of Arcana's Storia del Rock series)

 (Volume 1: 1951–1989)
 (Volume 2: 1990–2008)

Books on cognitive science and artificial intelligence
 (Volume 9 of Muzzio's Intelligenza Artificiale e Robotica series)
 (Volume 10 of Angeli's Prometheus series)

Other books
 (Volume 1367 of Feltrinelli's Universale economico series)

 (co-authored with Arun Rao)

References

External links 

Piero Scaruffi's knowledge base
Stanford University Piero Scaruffi page
 LASERs

1955 births
Italian emigrants to the United States
Italian music critics
Italian poets
Italian male poets
Italian music journalists
Living people
Olivetti people
People from Trivero
People from the Province of Biella
University of Turin alumni
Italian male non-fiction writers
Italian atheists
Rock critics